The  New York Giants season was the franchise's 32nd season in the National Football League. After finishing with an 8–3–1 record, the Giants won their fourth league title by defeating the Chicago Bears 47–7 in the NFL championship game. It was their first NFL title in eighteen years; the Giants did not win another for thirty more.

Transactions
July 27, 1956: Andy Robustelli was traded from the Los Angeles Rams to the Giants in exchange for New York's first round selection in the next NFL draft on November 26. The Rams used that pick, the eleventh overall, to select receiver Del Shofner of Baylor.

Regular season
Through the 1955 season, the Giants played their home games at the Polo Grounds. Their first game at Yankee Stadium was on October 21 against the Pittsburgh Steelers, and the attendance was 48,108.

Schedule

Postseason

Game Summaries

Week 1: at San Francisco 49ers

Week 2: at Chicago Cardinals

Week 3: at Cleveland Browns

Week 4: vs. Pittsburgh Steelers

Week 5: vs. Philadelphia Eagles

Week 6: at Pittsburgh Steelers

Week 7: vs. Chicago Cardinals

Week 8: at Washington Redskins

Week 9: vs. Chicago Bears

Week 10: vs. Washington Redskins

Week 11: vs. Cleveland Browns

Week 12: at Philadelphia Eagles

Standings

NFL Championship Game

Awards and honors
Rosey Brown, All-Pro selection
Sam Huff, All-Pro selection
Sam Huff, Rookie of the Year
Frank Gifford, NFL MVP
Frank Gifford, All-Pro selection
Frank Gifford ranked fifth in the league with 819 rushing yards, first with 5.2 yards per carry, and third in receiving with 51 catches for 603 yards. No other player had reached the Top 5 in all of these categories before Gifford.
Rosey Grier, All-Pro selection
Andy Robustelli, All-Pro selection
Emlen Tunnell, All-Pro selection

See also
List of New York Giants seasons

References 

 Giants on Pro Football Reference

External links 
 New York Giants official website—history section

New York Giants seasons
National Football League championship seasons
New York Giants
1956 in sports in New York City
1950s in the Bronx